Adriana Fonseca (born Adriana Fonseca Castellanos March 16, 1979) is a Mexican actress and dancer. She is best known for her roles in Televisa's telenovelas like La usurpadora as Veronica Soriano (1998), Rosalinda as Lucy Pérez Romero (1999), Mariana de la Noche as Caridad "Chachi" Montenegro (2003), Contra viento y marea as Sandra Serrano Rudell (2005), Bajo las riendas del amor as Montserrat Linares (2007) and for her role as the protagonist in Telemundo's successful telenovela Corazón Valiente as Angela Valdez (2012).

Biography 
Fonseca was born on March 16, 1979, in Veracruz, Veracruz, Mexico. She  is the daughter of dentists Hugo Fonseca and Guillermina Castellanos. She has one brother Hugo and one sister Jacqueline. She started her acting career by performing in a local television show. At 16, she was accepted into the C.E.A. (Centro de Education Artistica) in Mexico. After winning the award in the "El rostro de El Heraldo de México" competition in 1997, she participated in the soap opera La usurpadora. Fonseca had a lead role in the soap opera Rosalinda playing the little sister of Rosalinda, Lucy.

She has joined Telemundo network and she successfully played her main protagonist role in Corazón Valiente, alongside Ximena Duque, Aylin Mujica and José Luis Reséndez.

Filmography

Film

Television

Awards and nominations

Premios TVyNovelas

Premios People en Español

References

External links

Adriana Fonseca at the Mexican Telenovela Database 
Biography of Adriana Fonseca at the esmas
Official Site for Adriana Fonseca

1979 births
Living people
Mexican television actresses
Mexican telenovela actresses
Mexican film actresses
Mexican stage actresses
Actresses from Veracruz
20th-century Mexican actresses
21st-century Mexican actresses
Naturalized citizens of the United States